Brian Marton is an Australian sprint canoer who competed in the late 1990s and early first decade of the 21st century. He won a bronze medal in the K-4 1000 m event at the 1997 ICF Canoe Sprint World Championships in Dartmouth.

References

Australian male canoeists
Living people
Year of birth missing (living people)
ICF Canoe Sprint World Championships medalists in kayak